Mazhayethum Munpe (Before the Rain Comes) is a 1995 Malayalam romantic drama film directed by Kamal and written by Sreenivasan. The film stars Mammootty, Shobhana, Annie and Sreenivasan in the lead roles. The plot is centered upon a college professor named Nandakumar, his fiancée Uma Maheshwari, and his student Shruthi. The film was a commercial success. Annie won the Filmfare Award for Best Actress for her performance as Shruthi. In 2005, this movie was remade in Hindi by the same director as Zameer: The Fire Within starring Ajay Devgan, Ameesha Patel and Mahima Chaudhry.

Plot
The movie starts with Rahman (Sreenivasan) going to Kolkata in search of Nandakumar Varma (Mammootty). He finally finds Nandakumar in a depressed state. Rahman compels him to return home. But he refuses. Finally, he succumbs to the pressure and complies. The film then goes to flashback mode revealing the reasons for Nandakumar's estranged state.

Nandakumar was a college professor. He had moved to the city from his village in Kerala for the sake of his job. Rahman was his colleague with whom he stayed. In the college he had to confront a mischievous gang of girls headed by Shruthi (Annie). Nandakumar had a serious, no-nonsense attitude and the gang played a lot of pranks upon him. Nandakumar had a second life in his native village, where he had to take care of the treatment of his paralyzed fiancée Uma Maheshwari (Shobhana). It was to meet her medical expenses that he had taken up this job.

The tussle between Nandakumar and the gang proceeded in parallel. Gradually, Shruthi falls for Nandakumar and revealed her feelings for him. He laughed it off as a teenage infatuation. But she persisted. Meanwhile, Uma's condition improved remarkably with her regaining the ability to walk. Nandakumar, who had developed a cordial relationship with the gang by then, took them for a trip to his picturesque village. His main intention was to make Shruthi meet Uma so that she would change her mind. Shruthi got shattered on witnessing the warmth in the relationship between Uma and Nandkumar. After returning, she paid a discreet visit to Uma. There she revealed her feelings for Nandakumar to Uma. She accused Uma of being selfish and possessive by forcing Nandakumar to sacrifice his life and pleasures for her sake. Uma got a mental shock from the vitriolic behaviour of Shruthi and that triggered a second stroke. She became paralyzed again and doctors gave up all hope. She forced him to marry Shruthi and he complied reluctantly.

Even after the marriage, Nandakumar was not able to find any peace of mind. Their relationship was very cold. Later, Shruthi told Nandakumar about her meeting with Uma. Enraged by this revelation, he left his home. He wandered across places like a madman.

On coming back, Nandakumar learns that Shruthi had committed suicide after giving birth to his daughter. Rahman takes him to Uma's home. There he finds Uma, whose condition improved, taking care of his child who is also named Shruthi by Uma.

Cast
 Mammootty as Nandakumar Varma
 Shobhana as Uma Maheswari (Voice By Bhagyalekshmi)
 Annie as Shruthi ( Voice By Ambili)
 Sreenivasan as Rahman
 Suma Jayaram as Rehna, Rahman's wife 
 Praseetha Menon as Kunjumol, Shruthi's friend
 Manju Pillai as Anjana, Shruthi's friend 
 Keerthi Gopinath as Shwetha, Shruthi's friend
 Sankaradi as Uma's father
 N. F. Varghese as Valappil Kaimal
 Sukumari as Mariamma, caretaker of Shruthi's house
 T. P. Madhavan as Narayanan Nair
 Valsala Menon as College Principal
 Madhu Mohan as Dr. Issac
 Usharani

Release
The film was released on 31 March 1995.

Box office
The film was both commercial and critical success.

Soundtrack 

Raveendran composed 3 out of the six songs, while R. Anandh, a chennai-based prolific advertisement film composer who had debuted with the Mohanlal-starrer Nirnayam composed the rest. 
The film score was composed by S. P. Venkatesh.

Awards
Filmfare Awards South 
 Filmfare Award for Best Actress - Malayalam  - Annie
 Filmfare Award for Best Music Director - Malayalam - Raveendran
Kerala State Film Awards
 Best Screenplay - Sreenivasan
 Kerala State Film Award for Best Film with Popular Appeal and Aesthetic Value - Kamal, Madhavan Nair 
 Best Male Playback Singer - K. J. Yesudas - Aathmavin Pusthakathalil
 Ramu Kariat award - Kamal

References

External links

1995 films
1990s Malayalam-language films
Films with screenplays by Sreenivasan
Malayalam films remade in other languages
Films shot in Palakkad
Films directed by Kamal (director)
Films scored by Raveendran